The attack on Fort Paramacay, code name Operation David, was a military assault carried out in the morning of Sunday, August 6, 2017, between 3:50 a.m. and 8:00 a.m. in the Venezuelan town of Naguanagua, Carabobo.

Attack

The assault began when a group of 20 civilian dissidents commanded by Juan Caguaripano, a former captain (deserter since 2014) of the National Guard, stormed the Fort to steal weapons. First Lieutenant Jefferson García, of the plaza 4101 Commando Company, was the officer in charge of the Fort's weapons store; the 41st brigade of the Bolivarian Army was based at the Fort. Troops loyal to the government stopped the attack, causing ten of the dissidents (including Caguaripano) to flee, with seven of the group arrested, two dead, and one injured. The attackers who escaped had managed to take a considerable amount of munitions, including grenades and bullets. Though the attack ended at 8:00 am, civilians were protesting in the streets of the city later that day in support of the dissidents, which caused several clashes between them and the National Guard.

Stolen armaments
During the attack, the dissidents stole 500 AK-103 rifles and 500 magazines, 50 40mm multiple grenade launchers and 140 40mm grenades, 80 bayonets, 60 pistols and magazines. The weapons were placed in a Toyota vehicle with military plates and removed from Fort Paramacay.

Capture
Some of the members and leaders of the attack were captured in the following days. Two of the dissidents were reported by the government to have been killed during the assault: Yhonny Emisael Martínez Cedeño and Orlando Segundo Landino.

On January 15, 2018, after the El Junquito raid, where the dissident Óscar Alberto Pérez was killed, some of those who had been involved in this assault were also killed, and the owner of the truck with the stolen weaponry was captured.

See also

2017 Venezuelan constitutional crisis
2017 Venezuelan National Assembly attack
Caracas helicopter incident
El Junquito raid
Operation Gideon (2020)

References

Conflicts in 2017
2017 in Venezuela
Crisis in Venezuela
Political history of Venezuela
2017 Venezuelan protests